Mesonauta guyanae is a species of cichlid fish native to the Essequibo (Guyana) and Rio Negro (Brazil) basins in South America.

References 

guyanae
Freshwater fish of South America
Freshwater fish of Brazil
Fish of Guyana
Fish described in 1998